The Chevy Coupé SS is a stock car version of the Chevrolet Chevy, designed to race in the Turismo Carretera series, and developed and built since 1968.

References

Cars of Argentina
Turismo Carretera